Wormleybury Brook is a tributary of the River Lea which rises in the hills south of White Stubbs Lane in Hertfordshire, England.

Rivers of Hertfordshire
Tributaries of the River Lea
1Wormleybury